Trautmann is a German surname. Notable people with the surname include:

 Andreas Trautmann (born 1959), German footballer
 Bert Trautmann (1923–2013), German goalkeeper
 Catherine Trautmann (born 1951), French politician, mayor of Strasbourg
 Gene Trautmann (born 1966), drummer
 Reinhold Trautmann (1883–1951), German Slavist
 Richard Trautmann (born 1969), German judoka
 Thomas Trautmann (born 1940), American historian
 William Trautmann (1869–1940), founding General-Secretary of the U.S. Industrial Workers of the World (IWW) 

Trautman is the surname of:
 Adam Trautman (born 1997), American football player
 Allan Trautman (born 1955), American puppeteer and actor
 Andrzej Trautman (born 1933), Polish mathematical physicist
 Donald Walter Trautman (1936–2022), American Roman Catholic clergy, bishop of the Diocese of Erie
 George Trautman (1890–1963), American baseball executive and a college men's basketball coach
 George J. Trautman, III (born 1952), Deputy Commandant for Aviation of the United States Marine Corps
 Colonel Samuel Trautman, a fictional character in the first three Rambo films

Other
Trautmann mediation
Trautmann (film)
Trautmann (TV series)

See also
 Troutman (disambiguation)

German-language surnames